James Duncan Lawrence ( – ), best known as Jim Lawrence, was an American author best known for authoring most of the Tom Swift Jr. series of books (under the pseudonym Victor Appleton II) and Friday Foster comic strip.

Biography 
Lawrence was born in Detroit, Michigan in 1918.

As a freelance writer in the late 1940s and early 1950s, he wrote scripts for a number of radio shows, including The Green Hornet and Sergeant Preston of the Yukon.

In the 1950s and 1960s, he worked for the Stratemeyer Syndicate on a number of series (listed in the Bibliography).

In the 1970s, he worked for the Chicago Tribune and the New York News Syndicate with illustrator Jordi Longarón on Friday Foster comic strip.

Later in his career, Lawrence co-wrote two Infocom interactive fiction games with Stu Galley: Seastalker (1984) and Moonmist (1986).

Lawrence died in Summit, New Jersey in 1994.

Bibliography

Tom Swift Jr. series 
He wrote the following books in the Tom Swift Jr. series under the Stratemeyer Syndicate house pseudonym Victor Appleton II:
 Tom Swift and His Atomic Earth Blaster (1954)
 Tom Swift and His Outpost in Space (1955)/1977 reissue title: …And His Sky Wheel
 Tom Swift and His Diving Seacopter (1956)
 Tom Swift on the Phantom Satellite (1956)
 Tom Swift and His Ultrasonic Cycloplane (1957)
 Tom Swift and His Deep Sea Hydrodome (1958)
 Tom Swift in the Race to the Moon (1958)
 Tom Swift and Space Solartron (1958)
 Tom Swift and His Electronic Retroscope (1959)/1972 Reissue Title: …In The Jungle of the Mayas
 Tom Swift and His Spectromarine Selector (1960)
 Tom Swift and the Cosmic Astronauts (1960)
 Tom Swift and the Visitor from Planet X (1961)
 Tom Swift and the Electronic Hydrolung (1961)
 Tom Swift and His Triphibian Atomicar (1962)
 Tom Swift and His Megascope Space Prober (1962)
 Tom Swift and the Asteroid Pirates (1963)
 Tom Swift and His Repelatron Skyway (1963)
 Tom Swift and His Aquatomic Tracker (1964)
 Tom Swift and His 3-D Telejector (1964)
 Tom Swift and His Polar-Ray Dynasphere (1965)
 Tom Swift and His Sonic Boom Trap (1965)
 Tom Swift and His Subocean Geotron (1966)
 Tom Swift and the Mystery Comet (1966)
 Tom Swift and the Captive Planetoid (1967)

Hardy Boys series 
He revised the following books in the Hardy Boys series under the Stratemeyer Syndicate house pseudonym Franklin W. Dixon:
 The Mystery at Devil's Paw (1959)
 A Figure in Hiding (1965)
 The Secret Warning (1966)
 The Disappearing Floor (1964)
 The Sting of the Scorpion (1979)

Nancy Drew series 
He wrote the following books in the Nancy Drew series under the Stratemeyer Syndicate house pseudonym Carolyn Keene:
  Race Against Time (1982)
 Clue of the Ancient Disguise (1982)
 The Silver Cobweb (1983)
 The Haunted Carousel (1983)
 Enemy Match (1984)
 The Mysterious Image (1984)
 The Bluebeard Room (1985)
 The Phantom of Venice (1985)

Christopher Cool series 
He wrote the following books in the Christopher Cool series under the Stratemeyer Syndicate house pseudonym Jack Lancer:
 X Marks the Spy (1967)
 Mission: Moonfire (1967)
 Department of Danger (1967)
 Ace of Shadows (1967)
 Heads You Lose (1968)
 Trial by Fury (1969)

Binky Brothers series 
Along with Leonard P. Kessler, he wrote the following books in the Binky Brothers series:
 Binky Brothers, Detectives (1968)
 Binky Brothers and the Fearless Four (1970)

Man From Planet X series 
Writing as Hunter Adams, he wrote the following books in the Man From Planet X series:
 Man From Planet X: The She-Beast (1975)
 Man From Planet X: Tiger by the Tail (1975)
 Man From Planet X: The Devil to Pay (1975)

Dark Angel series 
The Dark Angel books all featured cover art by Lawrence's Friday Foster collaborator, Jordi Longarón.
 The Dream Girl Caper (1975)
 The Emerald Oil Caper (1975)
 The Gilded Snatch Caper (1975)
 The Godmother Caper (1975)

James Bond comic strip 
In 1969, he took over as the writer for the James Bond syndicated comic strip.

Among the titles were:
 The Man with the Golden Gun (1966)
 Octopussy (1966)
 The Spy Who Loved Me (1967)

The complete list is given in James Bond comic strips.

References

External links 

 
 Victor Appleton, II at LC Authorities, with 35 records, and at WorldCat
 Jack Lancer at LC Authorities, 6 records, and at WorldCat
 

1918 births
1994 deaths
American children's writers
Stratemeyer Syndicate
Writers from Detroit
Writers from Michigan
20th-century American writers
20th-century American male writers